John Pyle may refer to:

 John A. Pyle (born 1951), British atmospheric scientist
 John Howard Pyle (1906–1987), ninth governor of the U.S. state of Arizona
 John L. Pyle (1860–1902), attorney and politician from the state of South Dakota
 John M. Pyle (born 1956), American fugitive from justice for possession of child pornography

See also